The 2015–16 GFF Elite League (known as the 2015–16 Stag Elite League for sponsorship reasons) was the 15th season of the highest competitive football league in Guyana, and the 1st season of the Elite League. Eight FIFA licensed clubs participated in the inaugural Elite League season. The season was split into two parts (known as the Genesis and Finale rounds). Each half consisted of 14 rounds, with each team playing the other 7 teams twice each. In each round, the top 4 teams advanced to the playoffs. The winners of each half then faced off to determine the overall champion. The two half-season champions also advanced to the 2017 CFU Club Championship.

Slingerz (the Genesis round champions) defeated Alpha United (the Finale round champions) to win the overall championship.

Team information

Source:

Genesis round
The Genesis round consisted of 14 rounds from 18 September to 22 November 2015. Each team played the other 7 teams twice each. The top 4 teams advanced to the playoffs.

Genesis table

Genesis playoff round
The top 4 teams from the Genesis regular season advanced to the playoffs. The semifinals were played on 25 November, and the final was played on 29 November.

Semifinals
The two semifinal winners advanced to the Genesis round final.

Third-place match

Final
The winners of the Genesis round final were assured of a spot in the 2017 CFU Club Championship and the Champion of Champions game.

Finale round
The Finale round consisted of 14 rounds from 12 February to 4 June 2016. Each team played the other 7 teams twice each. The top 4 teams advanced to the playoffs.

Finale table

Finale playoff round
The top 4 teams from the Finale regular season advanced to the playoffs.

Semifinals
The two semifinal winners advanced to the Finale round final.

Third-place match

Final
The winners of the Finale round final were assured of a spot in the 2017 CFU Club Championship and the Champion of Champions game.

Champion of Champions
Slingerz (champions of the Genesis round) faced Alpha United (champions of the Finale round) in the Champion of Champions game to determine the season's overall champion.

References

GFF Elite League seasons
Guyana
football
football